The 2004 Brabantse Pijl was the 44th edition of the Brabantse Pijl cycle race and was held on 28 March 2004. The race started in Zaventem and finished in Alsemberg. The race was won by Luca Paolini.

General classification

References

2004
Brabantse Pijl